Meng Zhongkang (born April 1961) is a former Chinese army officer. He holds the rank of major general (Shaojiang) in the People's Liberation Army Ground Force. As of September 2019, he was under investigation by the China's top anti-corruption agency. Previously he served as political commissar of Jiangsu Military District and a member of the Standing Committee of the CPC Jiangsu Provincial Committee.

Career
Meng was born in Zhuji, Zhejiang, in April 1961. He graduated from PLA Xi'an Political College, PLA Nanjing Political College, and PLA Shijiazhuang Army Command College. In his early years, he served in the Beijing Military Region. In December 2010, he became director of Political Department of the 82nd Group Army and later became deputy political commissar. He was promoted to the rank of major general (Shaojiang) in July 2012. In January 2014, he was deputy political commissar of Joint Service Department of the Beijing Military Region. In January 2016 he was transferred to Fuzhou, capital of east China's Fujian province, and appointed deputy political commissar of the Eastern Theater Command Army. One year later, he was transferred again to Xuzhou, Jiangsu, where he was appointed political commissar of the 71st Group Army. But having held the position for only three months, he became political commissar of Jiangsu Military District. In January 2018, he was elected a member of the Standing Committee of the CPC Jiangsu Provincial Committee.

Investigation
In September 2019, he has been stripped of his posts for "serious legal violations" and was removed from membership of China's highest organ of state power and the national legislature, the National People's Congress.

References

1961 births
Living people
People from Zhuji
PLA National Defence University alumni
People's Liberation Army Nanjing Political College alumni
Delegates to the 13th National People's Congress
People's Liberation Army generals from Zhejiang